Anand Naidoo is a South African anchor and correspondent for CGTN America based in Washington, DC.

He currently hosts CGTN America's daily political talk show, The Heat.

He joined CGTN America in October 2012 after six years as an anchor for Al Jazeera English, and ten years as CNN International's World News anchor prior.
 
Before joining CNN in 1997, Anand was the evening news anchor for the South African Broadcasting Corp. in Johannesburg. He began his broadcast career in Belgium, where he worked as a field producer for Belgian television as well as a producer and anchor for the Belgian Radio World Service. 
 
Anand has also worked as a news editor on Radio 702, a Johannesburg independent radio station and a presenter on the South African cable station, M-Net.
 
He began his career as a newspaper journalist on the Johannesburg Rand Daily Mail.
 
Among the major stories Anand has covered during his career was the release of Nelson Mandela and the first all-race elections in South Africa in 1994. He has also  anchored breaking news coverage on the bomb blasts at the US embassies in Kenya and Tanzania, the North Korean missile tests, the Nato Air Campaign in Yugoslavia and the Bosnian war and the 2nd Gulf War in Iraq.

More recently, he has travelled extensively in Central and South America covering human rights and environmental issues.

Anand is the recipient of several prestigious journalism awards including the George Peabody award for coverage of Hurricane Katrina and the  Alfred I. duPont-Columbia University Award for coverage of the tsunami disaster in South East Asia.  
In April 2015, he was awarded the Bronze World Medal for Best News Anchor at the New York Festivals International TV and Film Awards. The jury cited his coverage of the rise of the Far Right in European politics in making the award.

He was awarded the Bronze Medal again for Best News Anchor at the New York Festivals TV & Film awards in April 2018 for his interview with John Nixon, the CIA agent who interrogated Saddam Hussein shortly after the Iraqi leader was captured by US forces.

References 

Living people
South African television journalists
South African people of Indian descent
Rhodes University alumni
CNN people
Al Jazeera people
George Peabody Medal winners
Year of birth missing (living people)
China Global Television Network people
CCTV newsreaders and journalists